Deh Sefid (also Romanized as Deh Sefīd, Deh Safīd, and Deh-e Sefid; also known as Deh Cheri and Deh Chirl) is a village in Kolyai Rural District, in the Central District of Asadabad County, Hamadan Province, Iran. At the 2006 census, its population was 265, in 67 families.

References 

Populated places in Asadabad County